Henry of Pelham Family Estate Winery is a family owned, Ontario winery that released their first vintage in 1988. Located where the valley of the Short Hills Bench meets the weathered mountain of the Niagara Escarpment.

History

The namesake of the winery, Henry (Smith) of Pelham was an early settler in Upper Canada’s Niagara Peninsula. His father Nicholas, the first settler, was Pennsylvania Dutch and a United Empire Loyalist who sided with the crown during the American Revolution of 1776. 
He was forced north from his home in Pennsylvania and served as a soldier, bugle boy and Iroquois translator with Butler's Rangers during the war. After the war he was granted  of land under the Kings' Grant as were many of his 14 children. Youngest son Henry Smith erected a building on his lot in 1842 that would become one of the first taverns in Upper Canada. The tavern was known variously as the Henry Smith Tavern and Mountainview Inn, one of the most popular wayside inns in the Niagara Peninsula, it was the setting for the largest public dances, fairs and social gatherings in the district. At the time of the Inn's popularity, the roads were made of stone and one of Ontario's first tollgates was located at the corner of Pelham Road and Fifth Street Louth. Commonly referred to as "Smith Settlement", the area was the pioneering gateway to the Niagara Escarpment, where the townships of Louth, Pelham and Thorold came together.

When applying for his liquor license young Henry signed his name "Henry of Pelham", winking at the fact that the recent British Prime Minister was Sir Henry Pelham. This became Henry's nom de plume and the name of the winery more than a century after he planted his first vineyards to native species of grapes.

Henry Smith owned and operated the tavern until February 10, 1856 when he died. The inn and lot were passed out of the family shortly thereafter. By 1982, Paul Speck and his three sons Paul, Matthew and Daniel, descendants of John Nicholas Smith, son of Nicholas Smith and Catherine May, purchased and rented lands around the old inn to begin growing grapes. A few years later, Paul purchased Lot 5, Concession 8, Louth Township, on which the inn was located and commenced the restoration of the buildings and the operation of the Henry of Pelham Family Estate Winery. Thus the Henry Smith Tavern and family lands were once again owned and operated by a Smith family member.

Grape varieties and wine styles
In the 1980s, there were only a few estate wineries dedicated to producing premium wines made from 100% Ontario-grown grapes. The winery was a founding member, in 1989, of the regions' appellation of origin system the Vintners Quality Alliance (VQA). The winery's focus is on Chardonnay, Riesling, Pinot Grigio, and Sauvignon Blanc for the whites, and Pinot Noir, Cabernet Franc/Cabernet Sauvignon/Merlot blends for the reds. They are also well known for their Baco Noir. Riesling and Cabernet Franc icewine along with their well-regarded Cuvee Catharine sparkling wines are also in their portfolio.

Sustainability 
In 2006, Henry of Pelham was the first vineyard to be certified as local and sustainable by Local Food Plus. Henry of Pelham follows Sustainable Winemaking Ontario’s world-leading standards with their farming practices since 2004. In 2017, they became one of only six Ontario wineries to be certified by the Wine Council of Ontario as following sustainable winemaking practices from vine to table. A member of the Porto Protocol.

Awards 

 2014 Cuvée Catharine Estate Blanc de Blanc - Sparkling Wine of the Year - 26th Ontario Wine Awards

References

External links

The Henry of Pelham Winery
Sustainable Wine On

Wineries of the Niagara Peninsula
Canadian companies established in 1982
Food and drink companies established in 1982
1982 establishments in Ontario